The University of Applied and Environmental Sciences (UDCA) is a private university located in Bogotá, Colombia.

It has three campuses:
the university campus located at Calle 222 No. 55-37, Bogota
the schools of Economics, Management, and Finance, located in the Teusaquillo locality
the North Headquarters, located on Calle 72 in the Chapinero locality.

History 
The institution was founded in 1978 as the Corporation School of Veterinary Medicine. In 1983, the name was changed to the University of Agricultural Sciences Corporation (CUDCA). In 1992, the Agricultural Engineering program was started, and in the following year the Sport Sciences program. In 1994, The Marketing Sciences program changed its name to Commercial Engineering. In 1995, the university again changed its name to "The University of Applied and Environmental Sciences Corporation", (UDCA). New programs were introduced in veterinary medicine, animal science and geographic engineering specializations.

In 2004, the corporation received recognition as a university. In 2005, it adopted the name of The University of Applied and Environmental Sciences (also UDCA).  Today, the university also features The School of Economics, Management and Finance (EEAF), Business Administration, Accounting, and Marketing and Finances.

Principles 
UDCA is an autonomous university providing a public service.
suitably-qualified students are accepted regardless of race, creed, sex, social status, or political/economic views.
UDCA supports socio-cultural values and sustainable human development, with respect for human rights, peace and democracy.
it orients students towards improving the quality of life of communities at the regional, local and national levels, creating conscious and responsible citizens
it aims to strengthen culture and regional identity, use national resources wisely, and preserve the environment for future generations.

Academic programs 
The university offers a variety of academic studies.

 Medicine
 Nursing
 Veterinary Medicine
 Agricultural Engineering
 Commercial Engineering
 Geographic  and Environmental Engineering
 Sports Science
 Environmental Sciences
 Animal Husbandry

 Chemistry
 Pharmaceutical Chemistry
 Economics, Management, and Finance
 Business Administration
 International Business
 Public Accounting
 Marketing

References

External links 
  Oficial Page Universidad de Ciencias Aplicada y Ambientales
  Consejo Nacional de Acreditación – Programas de pregrado acreditados

Education in Bogotá